Football in Egypt has traditionally been played by men as women were prevented from participating in sports.

Madame Sahar El Hawari is one of the innovators of Egyptian football helping form the  Egypt women's national football team and then going to the women's African cup of Nations.

National League
In 2000 a women's Egyptian league was set up.

National Team

FIFA has assessed the Egypt women's national football team and stated that the women footballers are good but could be better technically.

Many women experience prejudice for playing the sport. However, Sarah Essam became the first Egyptian to play in Europe for Stoke City in 2017.

See also

Football in Egypt
Egypt women's national football team

References

Football in Egypt
Women's sport in Egypt
Egypt